Chloride peroxidase is a family of enzymes that catalyzes the chlorination of organic compounds.  This enzyme combines the inorganic substrates chloride and hydrogen peroxide to produce the equivalent of Cl+, which replaces a proton in hydrocarbon substrate:
R-H  +  Cl−  +  H2O2  +  H+  →   R-Cl  +  2 H2O
In fact the source of "Cl+" is hypochlorous acid (HOCl). Many organochlorine compounds are biosynthesized in this way.

This enzyme belongs to the family of oxidoreductases, specifically those acting on a peroxide as acceptors (peroxidases).  The systematic name of this enzyme class is chloride:hydrogen-peroxide oxidoreductase. This enzyme is also called chloroperoxidase.  It employs one cofactor which may be either heme or vanadium.

The heme-containing chloroperoxidase (CPO) exhibits peroxidase, catalase and cytochrome P450-like activities in addition to catalyzing halogenation reactions. Despite functional similarities with other heme enzymes, the structure of CPO is unique, which folds into a tertiary structure dominated by eight helical segments. The catalytic acid base, required to cleave the peroxide O-O bond, is glutamic acid rather than histidine as in horseradish peroxidase.

Structural studies

References

Further reading
 
 
 

EC 1.11.1
Heme enzymes
Enzymes of known structure